Vallapuzha is a village and gram panchayat in Pattambi Taluk, Palakkad district in the state of Kerala, India.

Demographics 

 India census, Vallapuzha had a population of 28,018 with 13,424 males and
14,594 females.

Politics

Vallappuzha is part of Palakkad Lok Sabha constituency and Pattambi Legislative Assembly Constituency. It was a part of Valluvanad Taluk in Malabar District of Madras Presidency of British India. Late K T Mohammed was the first elected President of Vallappuzha Panchayath. He died on 16/08/1973.

Land Marks

Vallappuzha Railway station

Post office Vallappuzha

Fly Go Tours And Travels Vallapuzha

HSS VALLAPUZHA

State bank of India

Pearl Convention Centre Vallappuzha

Schools

 Vallapuzha GHS
 Vallappuzha HSS
 Vallapuzha Yatheemkhana HS
 Cherukode GLPS
 Cherukode BVA LPS
 Kuruvattoor AMLPS
 Kuruvattoor KMLPS
 Vallapuzha AMLPS
 Vallapuzha KVLPS
 Vallapuzha OALPS
 Vallapuzha VCMLPS
 Kuravattoor KCMUPS

Vallapuzha Grama Panchayat standing committee

 1	CHOLAMUKKU	NK ABDUL LATHEEF- President	        
 2	THARAKKALPADI		        
 3	APPAMKANDAM		                
 4	KALAPARAMBU - 	CK BABU	
 5	MECHERI	  -    ABDUL RAHEEM	
 6	CHOONGAPPILAVU - FOUSIYA IBRAHIM	
 7	KIZHAKKEKARA (Kuruvattoor) - 	BINDU SANTHOSH	
 8	ULLAMBUZHA	
 9	MATTAYA	        	
 10	CHERIKKALLU	
 11	CHOORAKKODE	
 12	PANCHARATHUPADI	- 	
 13	RAILWAY STATION	- PARAKKADAN RAFEEK	
 14	YARAM		
 15	PANNIYAMKUNNU		
 16	MANAKKALPADI

Transport

Rail
It has a railway station in the Southern Railway network. Every passenger and express trains stop here. It is a station between Angadipuram and Shoranur in Nilambur–Shoranur railway line. There are train services to Ernakulam and Thiruvananthapuram cities also.

Air

Calicut International Airport, Cochin International Airport and are the nearest airports.

Bus
Pattambi, cherpulassery, shornur are the nearest Bus stands.

Climate

References

External links

 വല്ലപ്പുഴ ഗ്രാമപഞ്ചായത്ത്

Villages in Palakkad district
Gram panchayats in Palakkad district